Suribachi can refer to:

 Suribachi, Japanese mortar
 Mount Suribachi, mountain on Iwo Jima, Japan
 Mount Suribachi (Antarctica), mountain in Antarctica
 USS Suribachi (AE-21), ship of the United States Navy
 Suribachi-class ammunition ship, class of ship of United States Navy